Motor Trend Group, LLC, formerly known as Source Interlink Media and TEN: The Enthusiast Network, is a media company that specializes in enthusiast brands, such as Motor Trend, Hot Rod, and Roadkill. Headquartered in Silver Spring, Maryland, it is a subsidiary of Warner Bros. Discovery (WBD).

Media and events
The company's network of brands includes more than 60 publications, 100 websites,  Motor Trend's Video on Demand channel, branded and licensed products, live events and competitions, as well as TV and radio programs. TEN's total audience is 158 million.

In 2013, the company signed a deal with the Bonnier Corporation, where they sold Dirt Rider, Motorcyclist, Sport Rider, Motorcycle Cruiser, Hot Bike, Baggers, Super Streetbike, Street Chopper, and ATV Rider, and they bought Sound + Vision and the TransWorld franchise.

In 2015, NBC Sports shuttered its action sports division, and sold the Dew Tour to TEN. On August 17 of that same year, TEN launched its subscription video on demand service Motor Trend OnDemand, which was the first SVOD service aimed at automotive enthusiasts. TEN CEO Scott Dickey described this community as "underserved and starved for premium video content" while positioning the SVOD service as "The Netflix for Gearheads."

On August 3, 2017, Discovery Communications announced it would acquire a majority stake in TEN, and contribute its automotive-oriented cable network Velocity into the company. The venture's goals is to create a larger, multi-platform presence for the company's brands, with a particular emphasis on direct-to-consumer streaming products. On April 10, 2018, it was announced that the company had been renamed Motor Trend Group effective immediately, and that Velocity would be rebranded under the Motor Trend name later in the year.

In 2017, TEN sold the AMA EnduroCross Championship to the Bonnier Motorcycle Group. TEN also sold Baseball America and Slam.

In March 2018, TEN sold Sound & Vision and Stereophile, along with related magazines and websites, to AVTech Media Ltd. In February 2019, TEN sold its adventure sports portfolio to American Media.

In December 2019, the company announced that 19 of the 22 magazines published by the company would be discontinued that month, including Automobile.

 Titles 

 Hot Rod Four Wheeler Motor Trend Video on demand & broadcasting 
Motor Trend OnDemand
Motor Trend

 Former titles 
 Circle Track Dirt Sports + Off-Road European Car Roadkill December 2019 discontinuations 
 Automobile Car Craft Chevy High Performance Classic Trucks Diesel Power Magazine Hot Rod Deluxe Jp Lowrider Mopar Muscle Muscle Car Review Mustang Monthly Street Rodder Super Chevy Super Street Truck Trend Truckin Petersen's 4-Wheel & Off-Road  Vette Muscle Mustangs & Fast FordsMerchandise
 And1 Advertising''

See also
Fausto Vitello

References

 
Magazine publishing companies of the United States
Publishing companies established in 2007
Companies based in Silver Spring, Maryland
Warner Bros. Discovery subsidiaries